Peter Gerber (born 22 May 1944) is a sailor from Austria. Gerber represented his country at the 1972 Summer Olympics in Kiel. Gerber took 20th place in the Soling with Ronni Pieper as helmsman and Hans Gut as fellow crew member.

References

Living people
1944 births
Swiss male sailors (sport)
Sailors at the 1972 Summer Olympics – Soling
Olympic sailors of Switzerland
20th-century Swiss people